John Shane Porteous (born 17 August 1942) (known as Shane Porteous) is an Australian actor, screenwriter, animation layout artist and animation voice artist. As a screenwriter, he is sometimes credited as "John Hanlon".

He remains best known for his role as in the TV serial A Country Practice, as Dr. Terence Elliot and original character and his ongoing role in TV series Pizza from 2000 until 2007. He has done numerous animation layouts and provided voice roles for feature film and shorts.

Biography

Early life
Shane Porteous was born John Shane Porteous in Coleraine, Victoria in 1942, to pilot Stanley Porteous and his wife Pat. He was raised in Queensland and attended the University of Queensland, graduating with a B.A. He was a member of the UQ Dramatic Society and performed with actors such as Jack Thompson and Michael Caton at the Avalon Theatre in 1965. Porteous moved to Sydney in 1967.

Porteous‘ grandfather Gladstone Porteous, served as an Australian missionary to China. His wife Jenny died in 2019 and he has three grown children Fiona, Polly and Ben.

Acting and screenwriting
Porteous is best known the television drama series A Country Practice as Dr. Elliot during its twelve-year run on the Seven Network (1981–93), a role for which he won the Silver Logie award in 1992. He has also won AWGIE Awards for his various scriptwriting projects. In the series he had various romances including Matron Curtis (Helen Scott), Dr. Alex Fraser (Diane Smith) and Rosemary Prior (Maureen Edwards) who he married in the final episode.

Other TV credits include Catch Kandy, Homicide, Matlock Police, Certain Women 1973-76, The Box in 1974, Number 96 in 1977, Glenview High, Cop Shop, The Restless Years, Neighbours, Home and Away, Blue Heelers and Heartbreak High.

Porteous has performed in many stage plays, among them Hamlet, Death of a Salesman (1970), the Sydney Theatre Company's production of King Lear and Much Ado About Nothing. In June 2010 he completed a touring performance of Codgers with Ron Haddrick among others.

He was a regular at the Q Theatre in Penrith, New South Wales, and was also the ambassador for "The Q", which was demolished in August 2005 and moved to the Joan Sutherland Performing Arts Centre.

As a television screenwriter he has written scripts for series including Neighbours and Home and Away, sometimes under the pseudonym of John Hanlon.

Animation
Porteous has also provided animation services to Hanna-Barbera, and has created layouts for the film versions of The Magic Pudding and Blinky Bill.

Popular culture
He is referenced in the popular Australian song "I'm So Post Modern" by the Bedroom Philosopher.

Awards

Filmography

Scriptwriter

Animation

Appearances

References

External links
 

1942 births
20th-century Australian male actors
21st-century Australian male actors
Australian male soap opera actors
Australian soap opera writers
Living people
Logie Award winners
People from Coleraine, Victoria
Recipients of the Centenary Medal
Australian male television writers